Ángel Lombardo (born 13 February 1983 in Panama) is a Panamanian retired footballer.

Career

In 2013, Lombardo suffered went into a coma for a month due to a car accident, causing him to retire despite recovering enough to play football a year later.

References

External links
 Ángel Lombardo at National Football Teams

Panamanian footballers
Living people
Association football midfielders
1983 births
Panama international footballers
C.D. Plaza Amador players
Unión Deportivo Universitario players
Sportspeople from Panama City